The DF Helicopters DF334 is a two-seat, single-engine light utility helicopter in development by Dragon Fly Helicopters in Northern Italy. The DF 334 is a development of the Dragon Fly 333, developed by archaeologists and filmmakers Angelo and Alfredo Castiglioni in the 1980s. The DF334 has a larger, full composite cabin, a Rotax 914 4-stroke turbocharged engine, a governor fuel control, and an advanced Electronic Flight Instrument System. The helicopter is intended for both amateur and professional pilots.

DF Helicopters was acquired in 2010 by the Swiss Avio International Group.

Specifications

See also

References

External links

 Avio International
 Manufacturer's website

1980s Italian civil utility aircraft
1980s Italian helicopters
Aircraft first flown in 1989
Single-engined piston helicopters